Subhash Vasu is the ex-chairman of the Spices Board of India (Ministry of Commerce and Industry, Government of India). He is the  national president of the BDJS party and SNDP Mavelikara union president. He was also the former Travancore Devaswom Board member until 2015. He was the NDA candidate from Kuttanad, Kerala during 2016 Kerala Legislative Assembly election.

References

Narayana Guru
Living people
Politicians from Alappuzha
Year of birth missing (living people)
Malayali people